United Nations Security Council Resolution 87, adopted on 29 September 1950, considering that its duty is to investigate any situation likely to lead to international friction, the Council decided that it would respond to declarations by the People's Republic of China regarding an armed invasion of the island of Taiwan after 15 October 1950 when representatives from both the PRC and the ROC would be present.

The resolution was adopted by 7 votes, with the Republic of China, Cuba and the United States voting against and one abstention from Egypt.

See also
 List of United Nations Security Council Resolutions 1 to 100 (1946–1953)

References
UNdocs.org: Text of the U.N. Security Council Resolution 87

 0087
1950s in China
History of Taiwan
1950 in Taiwan
1950 in China
 0087
Taiwan under Republic of China rule
September 1950 events
20th century in Taiwan